Kouame Calixte Aholou (born 14 October 1970) is a Togolese former sprinter. He competed in the men's 4 × 100 metres relay at the 1992 Summer Olympics.

References

External links
 

1970 births
Living people
Athletes (track and field) at the 1992 Summer Olympics
Togolese male sprinters
Olympic athletes of Togo
Place of birth missing (living people)
21st-century Togolese people